List of Water Ski European Championships champions.

See also
 Water skiing
 Masters Tournament (water ski)
 List of Water Ski World Championships champions
 List of Water Skiing Under-21 European Champions
 List of Water Skiing Under-17 European Champions

References

 http://iwwfeatc.com/records

External links
International Waterski & Wakeboard Federation

 
Water Skiing